The Kuranda Scenic Railway is a tourist railway service that operates along the heritage-listed Cairns-to-Kuranda railway line.   Constructed in 1891, the line runs from Cairns, Queensland, over the Great Dividing Range to the town of Kuranda on the Atherton Tableland.  Along the way, the route passes through the Macalister Range, as well as the suburbs of Stratford, Freshwater and Redlynch.  Along the way, the train also stops at a lookout, which provides views of Barron Falls.

Train services operate every day of the year, except on Christmas Day.  A one-way trip takes approximately one hour and 55 minutes.

It is still used for some freight services and other passenger services, including The Savannahlander.

Attractions
The tropical gardens at Kuranda rail station are a well-known attraction in the area. Downhill the line cuts through the Barron Gorge National Park. The tourist train stops at a lookout, with a sweeping view of Barron Falls. A number of smaller waterfalls are passed, including Stoney Creek Falls. The station is a short walk into town where there is a zoo, markets, art galleries and ethnic Aboriginal crafts. At the bottom of the mountain, Freshwater railway station, Queensland has an information centre, a gift shop, and a café that is inside of an old train carriage. As the train travels up and down, a detailed and informative commentary of the railway's construction is provided.

History 

Construction of the railway began in 1886. The railway was completed as far as Kuranda in by 1891. Passenger services began operations on 25 June 1891.

Many people died during the construction of the numerous tunnels and bridges of the line. 15 hand-made tunnels and 37 bridges were built to climb from sea level to  up the Macalister Range. Three million cubic metres of earth had to be excavated during construction.

The first operation of a tourist train from Cairns to Kuranda was in 1936, using four longitudinal seating carriages. In 1995 major repairs had to be carried out after a severe rock fall damaged the track. On 26 March 2010 the train was derailed by a landslide injuring 5 of the 250 passengers on board. The service was closed until 7 May 2010 while a geotechnical review of the track and risk assessments were completed.

Awards 
In 2009 as part of the Q150 celebrations, the Kuranda Scenic Railway was announced as one of the Q150 Icons of Queensland for its role as a "structure and engineering feat".

See also

Construction of Queensland railways
Skyrail Rainforest Cableway

References

External links

Kuranda Scenic Railway
Cairns museum Cairns-Kuranda Railway Construction
Google Earth .kml that shows track of the skyrail as well as railway between Cairns and Kuranda.

Railway lines in Queensland
Far North Queensland
Tourist attractions in Far North Queensland
Railway lines opened in 1891
1891 establishments in Australia
Tourism in Cairns
Tourist railways in Queensland
Q150 Icons